The Vilcabamba thistletail (Asthenes vilcabambae) is a species of bird in the family Furnariidae. It is endemic to the Vilcabamba Mountains of Peru.

Its natural habitats are subtropical or tropical moist montane forest and subtropical or tropical high-altitude grassland.

The Ayacucho thistletail was at one time considered to be a subspecies of the Vilcabamba thistletail. A phylogenetic study published in 2015 that examined both DNA sequence data and vocalization recordings of members of the genus Asthenes found that the Ayacucho thistletail was more similar to the eye-ringed thistletail than it was to the Vilcabamba thistletail. Based on this evidence the subspecies A. v. ayacuchensis was elevated to species rank.

References

Vilcabamba thistletail
Birds of the Peruvian Andes
Endemic birds of Peru
Vilcabamba thistletail
Vilcabamba thistletail
Vilcabamba thistletail
Taxonomy articles created by Polbot